The Clown Motel is a clown-themed motel along north Main Street in Tonopah, Nevada which has been referred to as "America's scariest motel". The building is located adjacent to Tonopah Cemetery where the father of the original owners is buried.

History
The 31-room Clown Motel was opened in 1985 by Lenroy and David in honor of their late father Clarence David whose collection of over 150 clown statues was used to decorate the property.

In 1995, Bob Perchetti bought the motel and operated it for 22 years until 2017 when he put the property up for sale for $900,000. Two years later the property was purchased by Vijay Mehar who appointed his former art director family friend Hame Anand as CEO, who gave a new facelift to the motel and increased the collection from 600 clown statues to over 2,000 pieces of clown memorabilia.

See also

References

1985 establishments in Nevada
Motels in the United States
Tonopah, Nevada
Companies based in Nevada